Carbost  is a village on the south-west shore of Loch Harport on the Minginish peninsula on the Isle of Skye and is in the Highland council area.

Carbost becomes a tourist hub in summer months due to the presence of the Talisker Distillery which is also one of the main employers in the village along with the local pub, The Old Inn.

Along the main road there is a community run grocery & provisions store and a coffee shop, Caora Dhubh (which means 'Black Sheep' in Scottish Gaelic.) North of the distillery, Carbost Waterfront provides access to the water via a Pier, slipway & pontoons. Moorings are provided for residents and visitors with fishing boats, yachts & other recreational craft. These facilities are maintained by a community company which is expanding the facilities, including mains water to the pier & pontoons.

Carbost lies 8 miles from Glen Brittle Fairy Pools, 3 miles from Portnalong and 4 miles from Fiskavaig.

References

Populated places in the Isle of Skye